The Blohm & Voss P 194 was a German design for a mixed-power Stuka or ground-attack aircraft and tactical bomber, during World War II.

History
Along with the P 192, P 193, and P 196, the P 194 was one of four designs Blohm & Voss submitted in response to a requirement issued by the RLM in February 1944 for a stuka or ground-attack aircraft and tactical bomber to replace the Junkers Ju 87.
 
In the event, the RLM decided not to go ahead with a new aircraft but instead to adapt the existing Messerschmitt Me 262 jet fighter to the tactical bomber role.

Design
Like several other designs by Richard Vogt, the P 194 featured an asymmetric arrangement. The layout was broadly similar to that of the BV 141: the crew and weapons were carried in a large nacelle offset from the main fuselage structure that carried a propeller-driven engine in the nose and the empennage at the rear, joined by a common wing. However, in the P 194, a turbojet was added low down at the rear of the crew nacelle and the thrust from this engine was intended to help balance the thrust from the propeller.

A powerful cluster of guns was to be located in the nose of the nacelle, clear of the propeller, and a bombload of up to 500 kg (1,100 lb) was to be carried in an internal bomb bay in the fuselage.

Using a high proportion of steel in its structure, the design of the P 194 was simplified by using a significant number of parts from other projects, notably the BV 155 prototype and earlier BV 237 asymmetric stuka proposal.

Variants
P 194.00-101version with 16 m (52 ft) wingspan and jet intake under cockpit pod
P 194.01-02version with 15.3 m (50.2 ft) wingspan, bubble canopy and jet intake under cockpit pod 
P 194.02-01as above, but with turbojet located beneath cockpit
P 194.03-01as P 194.01-02, but with jet intakes located in the wing roots at the sides of the cockpit pod.

Specifications (P 194-01, as designed)

Notes

References
 Hugh Cowin, "Blohm und Voss Projects of World War II", Part I, Air Pictorial, October 1963, pp. 313–314.

External links

1940s German bomber aircraft
Mixed-power aircraft
Asymmetrical aircraft
P 194